PROX may refer to:
PReferential OXidation
The stock symbol of Proximus in Euronext.